Hefei Metro Line 5 is a metro line in Hefei, Anhui, China. South section of Phase 1 opened on 26 December 2020. North section of Phase 1 opened on 26 December 2022.

Opening timeline

Stations

References

05
2020 establishments in China
Railway lines opened in 2020